The second round of the men's keirin of the 2012–13 UCI Track Cycling World Cup took place in Glasgow, at the Sir Chris Hoy Velodrome on 17 November 2012. 20 cyclists participated in the contest.

Competition format
The keirin races involve 6.5 laps of the track behind a pace-setter, followed by a 2.5 lap sprint to the finish.  The tournament consisted of a first round and repackages, a second round and the finals. The first rounds and repechages narrowed the field to 12. The second round divided the remaining 12 into six finalists. The final round also included a ranking race for 7th to 12th place.

Schedule
Saturday 17 November
12:35-13:05 First round
14:00-14:30 First round repaches
20:04-20:14 Second round
21:16-21:21 Finals 7th – 12th Places
21:23-21:28 Finals 1st – 6th Places

Schedule from Tissottiming.com

Results

First round
The top 2 cyclists of each heat advanced to the second round and the others to the repaches.

Heat 1

Heat 2

Heat 3

Heat 4

Heat 5

Heat 6

Results from Tissottiming.com

First Round Repaches
The first rider of each heat advanced to the second round.

Heat 1

Heat 2

Heat 3

Heat 4

Heat 5

Heat 6

Results from Tissottiming.com

Second round
The first three riders of each heat advanced to the final race.
The top 3 riders of each heat advanced to the final race and the others to 7th – 12 classification race.

Heat 1

Heat 2

Results from Tissottiming.com

Finals
 7th – 12th classification race

Final race

Results from Tissottiming.com

Final classification

Results from Tissottiming.com

References

2012–13 UCI Track Cycling World Cup
UCI Track Cycling World Cup - Round 2
UCI Track Cycling World Cup - Round 2
UCI Track Cycling World Cup – Men's keirin